Yuri Lvov is a micromanufacturing specialist, a chemistry professor, and the Tolbert Pipes Eminent Endowed Chair on Micro and Nanosystems at the Institute for Micromanufacturing (Louisiana Tech University). He earned his B.S. in 1974 and his Ph.D. in 1979 in Physical Chemistry (protein crystallography) from Moscow State University, Russia. He worked at the Max Planck Institute, on the Japanese ERATO Supramolecule Project, and at the USA Naval Research Laboratory before moving to Louisiana Tech in 1999. Love was named to his professorship in 2004.

Luvov's area of specialization is nanotechnology, specifically the nanoassembly of ultrathin organized films, bio/nanocomposites, nano/construction of ordered shells on tiny templates (drug nanocapsules, shells on microbes and viruses), and clay nanotubes for controlled release of bioactive agents. Lvov holds nine US and Japanese patents on nanoassembly. He helped develop the polyelectrolyte layer-by-layer (LbL) assembly - a nanotechnology method which was first described in papers in 1993. LbL nanoassembly has found industrial applications including eye lens modification, improvement of cellulose fiber for better fabric and paper, microcapsules for insulin sustained release and cancer drug nanocapsules.

His group's funding exceeded $4 million in the last five years.

References

External links

 Dr. Yuri Lvov

Louisiana Tech University faculty
Moscow State University alumni
Living people
Year of birth missing (living people)
Russian physical chemists